At the Chelsea Nightclub is The Members' first album, released in 1979.

Reception
Smash Hits said, "the Members are supposed to be one of the hottest post-punk rock bands around, but I have my doubts. They're disposable pop rather than committed rock, though their cocky soccer-crowd style has some good clever touches. AllMusic called it, "the only Members album worth owning".

Track listing

2005 CD bonus tracks

Personnel
The Members
Nicky Tesco - lead vocals
Nigel Bennett - lead guitar, vocals
Jean-Marie Carroll - guitar, vocals 
Chris Payne - bass, vocals
Adrian Lillywhite - drums, percussion
Steve "Rudi" Thompson - saxophone
Technical
Alan Perkins, Paul "Groucho" Smykle (track: B2), Pete Wandless - engineer
Malcolm Garrett - artwork

References

1979 debut albums
The Members albums
Albums produced by Steve Lillywhite
Virgin Records albums